This is a list of nationwide public opinion polls that were conducted relating to the general election for the 2020 United States presidential election. If multiple versions of polls are provided, the version among likely voters (LV) is prioritized, then registered voters (RV), then adults (A). Polling in the 2020 election was considerably less accurate than in the 2016 election, and possibly more inaccurate than in any election since 1996.

Polling aggregation

Two-way
The following graph depicts the standing of each candidate in the poll aggregators from September 2019 to November 2020. Former Vice President Joe Biden, the Democratic nominee, had an average polling lead of 7.9 percentage points over incumbent President Donald Trump, the Republican nominee. Biden would win the national popular vote by 4.4 percentage points.

Four-way
Calculated averages are not comparable to those for the Biden vs. Trump polls. As polling with third parties has been very limited, the polls included in the average are often different.

National poll results

October 1 – November 3, 2020

September 1 – September 30, 2020

July 1 – August 31, 2020

May 3 – June 30, 2020

Jan 1 – May 2, 2020

2017–2019

See also
Nationwide hypothetical polling for the 2020 United States presidential election
Statewide opinion polling for the 2020 United States presidential election
Nationwide opinion polling for the 2020 Democratic Party presidential primaries
Statewide opinion polling for the 2020 Democratic Party presidential primaries
Opinion polling for the 2020 Republican Party presidential primaries
2020 Democratic National Convention
2020 Republican National Convention
Opinion polling on the Donald Trump administration

Notes

Partisan clients

References

External links
General election poll tracker from FiveThirtyEight